Kristian Ronneburg (born 22 October 1986) is a German politician, currently serving as Member of the Abgeordnetenhaus of Berlin since 22 October 2016 representing the Marzahn-Hellersdorf 6 constituency for The Left.

Education
Bertram was born in Magdeburg but grew up in Marzahn-Hellersdorf. He received his Abitur from Wilhelm-von-Siemens-Gymnasium in Berlin and graduated with a Bachelor of Social Sciences from Otto von Guericke University Magdeburg.

Political career
Prior to entering the Abgeordnetenhaus, Ronneburg served as a borough councillor in Marzahn-Hellersdorf. At the 2016 election Ronneburg was elected as Member of the Abgeordnetenhaus for the Marzahn-Hellersdorf 6 constituency. He is The Left party group spokesperson on petitions.

References

Living people
1986 births
German social scientists
The Left (Germany) politicians
Members of the Abgeordnetenhaus of Berlin
Politicians from Magdeburg
Otto von Guericke University Magdeburg alumni